National Research Centre for Plant Biotechnology, Hisar (CPB), a collaborator of ICAR, is responsible for the research, genetic diversity analysis, propagation of tissue culture technology, training and mass propagation of planting material of newly developed fruits, crop varieties and rare medicinal, horticultural, forest, ornamental and other plant species. It is located next to HARSAC within the CCS Haryana Agricultural University, Hisar in the Haryana state of India.

It also offers plant biotechnology training on its own, as well as masters and doctoral research degrees in association with CCS HAU.

History
It was setup in 2000 as the "Centre for Research and Applications in Plant Tissue Culture" with Government of India's funding, taken over by the Government of Haryana in 2005, and renamed as "Centre for Plant Biotechnology" in 2007 with enhanced responsibilities and research scope.

Plant Information Centres
CPB has Plant Information Centres In Haryana at the following institutes:
 PCB main campus at Hisar within CCS HAU
 Deenbandhu Chhotu Ram University of Science and Technology (DCRUST)
 GJU Hisar
 Chaudhary Devi Lal University, Sirsa
 BPS Women's University, Sonepat

See also

 List of universities and colleges in Hisar
 List of institutions of higher education in Haryana
 List of agricultural universities and colleges
 List of think tanks in India

References 

Universities and colleges in Hisar (city)
Agriculture in Haryana
Science and technology in Haryana
Research institutes in Hisar (city)
Agricultural universities and colleges in Haryana
Educational institutions established in 2000
2000 establishments in Haryana